(Caroline Henriette) Emilie Haspels (15 September 1894, Colmschate – 25 December 1980, Capelle aan den IJssel) was a Dutch classical archaeologist.

Life

Emilie Haspels was the daughter of George Frans Haspels.  Her 1936 book Attic Black Figured-Lekythoi, based on her work at the University of Utrecht, has remained the standard on lekythoi since its publication.

From 1937 to 1939, she worked on the excavation of the Midas City in Yazılıkaya, Eskişehir.  Surprised by the outbreak of war, she could not return to Europe and remained in Istanbul, where she taught at the University of Istanbul. From 1946 to 1965, she was Professor of Classical Archaeology at the University of Amsterdam. In 1960 she became member of the Royal Netherlands Academy of Arts and Sciences.

Publications

 Attic black-figured lekythoi, Paris, 1936.
 La cité de Midas : céramique et trouvailles diverses, Paris 1951
 The highlands of Phrygia : sites and monuments, 2 vols, Princeton 1971
 A Misleading Lekythos in the Villa Giulia Museum (Talanta, 1973)
I am the last of the travelers : Midas city excavations and surveys in the highlands of Phrygia, ed. Dietrich Berndt ; contributions by Halet Çambel. İstanbul, Arkeoloji ve Sanat Yayınları, 2009.

Notes

References
 Biography at historici.nl (in Dutch).
 Jaap M. Hemelrijk, "In memoriam Prof. Dr. CHE Haspels, September 15, 1894 - December 25, 1980", Bulletin antieke beschaving. Annual Papers on Classical Archaeology 56:1-2, 1981
 Jaap M. Hemelrijk, "Licht in der Dunkelheit und eine Nadel im Heuhaufen. Die niederländische Archäologin CH Emilie Haspels (1894-1980) führte ein abenteuerliches Leben im Dienste der Wissenschaft", Antike Welt 37:1:80-82, 2006

1894 births
1980 deaths
Classical archaeologists
20th-century Dutch archaeologists
Knights of the Order of the Netherlands Lion
Members of the Royal Netherlands Academy of Arts and Sciences
People from Deventer
Academic staff of the University of Amsterdam
Dutch women archaeologists
Travelers in Asia Minor